Sean McCaffrey (12 September 1959 – 30 December 2017) was an Irish football manager. He was the first team manager of League of Ireland Premier Division side Dundalk taking over in January 2012, replacing Ian Foster.
He left the club by mutual consent in July 2017.

Speaking after being appointed he said "I'm delighted to get the job. I think it's a club with a fantastic fan base and huge potential. It's a huge football town. The Dundalk Schoolboys' League is on your doorstep, and I know a lot of people involved in it."

McCaffrey was involved in the establishment of his home town club Monaghan United in 1979, and subsequently managed the team for a number of years, including their debut League of Ireland season in 1985-86.

In 2003, he succeeded Brian Kerr as coach of the Republic of Ireland U17, U18 and U19 teams, remaining in the role until 2010.

He died on 30 December 2017 from heart failure

References

As a young man McCaffrey played for Leicester City and West Bromwich Albion FC

1959 births
2017 deaths
League of Ireland players
Dundalk F.C. managers
League of Ireland managers
Association footballers from County Monaghan
Monaghan United F.C. managers
Monaghan United F.C. players
Association footballers not categorized by position
Republic of Ireland association footballers
Republic of Ireland football managers